Agricultural Exhibition Center station is a subway station on Line 10 of the Beijing Subway in Chaoyang District. It is named after the National Agricultural Exhibition Center (zh).

The station has an underground island platform.

There are 2 exits, lettered A and D. Exit D is accessible.

External links

References

Beijing Subway stations in Chaoyang District
Railway stations in China opened in 2008